The 2022 Northeast Conference men's basketball tournament was the postseason men's basketball tournament for the Northeast Conference (NEC) for the 2021–22 NCAA Division I men's basketball season. The tournament took place on four dates between February 28 and March 8, 2022, with each game hosted by the higher-seeded school. The tournament winner, the Bryant Bulldogs, received the conference's automatic bid to the NCAA tournament, the first for the Bulldogs. This was also Bryant's final season in the NEC, as the school joined the America East Conference that July.

Seeds 
All nine of the eligible ten teams in the conference qualified for the tournament. Teams were seeded by record within the conference, with a tiebreaker system to seed teams with identical conference records.

The tiebreakers used by the NEC are 1) head-to-head records of teams with identical records, 2) comparison of records against individual teams in the conference starting with the top-ranked team(s) and working down and 3) NCAA NET Rankings available on day following the conclusion of Northeast Conference regular-season play. The round-robin record tiebreaker was used to place Saint Francis (PA), Fairleigh Dickinson, and Central Connecticut in that order for the last three seeds.

 Note: Merrimack College joined the Northeast Conference from the Division II Northeast-10 Conference in 2019. At the time, the NEC did not allow transitional members to play in the conference tournament, making the Warriors ineligible until 2024. After the 2021–22 season, the NEC presidents voted to allow transitional members to compete in the conference tournament starting with their third transitional seasons, making Merrimack eligible for the tournament starting with the 2023 edition.

Schedule

Bracket 

* denotes overtime period.

Awards and honors 
Tournament MVP: Peter Kiss

First Team
 Alex Morales, Wagner
 Tyrn FLowers, Long Island
 Peter Kiss, Bryant
 Charles Pride, Bryant
 Hall Elisias, Bryant

Championship game brawl 

During the Championship game between Bryant and Wagner, with 4:37 left in the game a fight between fans of both teams. The altercation lasted almost half an hour resulting in many fans being escorted out in addition to Wagner guard Will Martinez being ejected from the game. The game was later resumed resulting in a 70–43 Bryant victory. Before the Bryant fans would be able to storm the court, Wagner had to exit the floor to prevent any more conflict. After the game, 20-year-old Bryant student Connor Gleim was arrested by the Rhode Island State Police. Gleim was charged with disorderly conduct and obstructing an officer in execution of duty.

See also 

 2022 Northeast Conference women's basketball tournament

References 

Tournament
Northeast Conference men's basketball tournament
Northeast Conference men's basketball tournament